Bryan Gallego (born March 10, 1993) is a former American soccer player.

Career

Youth, college and amateur
Gallego grew up in Kinnelon, New Jersey and graduated from Kinnelon High School as part of the class of 2011. He spent his youth career with the New York Red Bulls Academy. However, on December 3, 2012, the Portland Timbers acquired the MLS Homegrown rights for Gallego in a trade that sent Kosuke Kimura to the New York Red Bulls.

Following his time in the Red Bulls youth system, Gallego spent three seasons at the University of Akron. In 2011, he started all 22 games he appeared in and was named College Soccer News Freshman All-American, All-MAC Second Team and All-Ohio team. In 2012, he started all 22 games and finished the year with a goal and an assist on his way to being named All-MAC Second Team for the second straight year. In 2013, he appeared in 20 games and helped the Zips record nine shutouts and hold opponents to one or fewer goals in 19 of 22 games. He went on to be named NSCAA All-America Second Team, All-Great Lakes Region First Team and All-MAC First team.

During his time in college, Gallego also played in the USL Premier Development League for Michigan Bucks and Portland Timbers U23s.

Professional
On January 15, 2014, Gallego signed a homegrown contract with MLS club Portland Timbers, making him the third homegrown signing in club history.  A month later, he was loaned to USL Pro affiliate club Sacramento Republic FC.  However, he was recalled by the Timbers after not making an appearance for the club and loaned out to Arizona United SC on April 24.  He made his professional debut the following day in a 1-1 draw with LA Galaxy II.

References

External links

1993 births
Living people
American soccer players
Akron Zips men's soccer players
Flint City Bucks players
Homegrown Players (MLS)
Portland Timbers U23s players
Portland Timbers players
Sacramento Republic FC players
Phoenix Rising FC players
Association football defenders
People from Kinnelon, New Jersey
Soccer players from New Jersey
Sportspeople from Morris County, New Jersey
USL League Two players
USL Championship players
United States men's youth international soccer players
United States men's under-20 international soccer players
United States men's under-23 international soccer players